Jan-Åke Carlberg (born 21 December 1957) is a Swedish speed skater. He competed at the 1980 Winter Olympics and the 1984 Winter Olympics.

References

1957 births
Living people
Swedish male speed skaters
Olympic speed skaters of Sweden
Speed skaters at the 1980 Winter Olympics
Speed skaters at the 1984 Winter Olympics
Sportspeople from Stockholm
20th-century Swedish people